Nise da Silveira (February 15, 1905 – October 30, 1999) was a Brazilian psychiatrist and a student of Carl Jung. She devoted her life to psychiatry and has never been in agreement with the aggressive forms of treatment of her time such as commitment to psychiatric hospitals, electroshock, insulin therapy and lobotomy.

Biography
Nise da Silveira was born in Maceió, in the northeastern state of Alagoas, Brazil, in 1905. She graduated from the Medical School of Bahia in 1926, the only woman among 157 men.

In 1952, she founded the Museum of Images of the Unconscious in Rio de Janeiro, a study and research center that collected the works produced in painting and modeling studios. Through her work, Nise da Silveira introduced Jungian psychology in Brazil.
A few years later, in 1956, Nise da Silveira developed another revolutionary project for her time: the creation of the "Casa das Palmeiras" (Palms House), a clinic for former patients of psychiatric institutions, where they could freely express their art and be treated as outpatients on a daily basis. She also formed the C.G. Jung Study Group, which she chaired until 1968.

Her research on occupational therapy and the understanding of the psychotic process through images of the unconscious gave origin, along the years, to exhibitions, films, documentaries, audiovisuals, courses, symposiums, publications and conferences. She was also a pioneer in researching emotional relations between patients and animals, whom she used to call co-therapists.

In recognition of her work, Nise da Silveira was awarded decorations, titles and prizes in different areas of knowledge. She was a founding member of the International Society for Psychopathological Expression headquartered in Paris, France. Her work and ideas inspired the creation of museums, cultural centers, and therapeutic institutions in Brazil and overseas.

On July 8, 2022, her name was writhed in Brazilian "Livro dos Heróis e Heroínas da Pátria" (Book of Heroes and Heroines of the Motherland) by Brazilian Federal Law 14.401/2022.

Death
Nise died on October 30, 1999, in Rio de Janeiro.

Her life and work were portrayed by Glória Pires in the 2015 biographical Brazilian film Nise: The Heart of Madness, directed by Roberto Berliner. Glória Pires also portrayed Nilse da Silveira in the 2022 Brazilian telenovela Além da Ilusão.

Tribute
On February 15, 2020, Google celebrated her 115th birthday with a Google Doodle.

References

Bibliography
 Casa das Palmeiras. A Emoção de Lidar. Uma Experiência em Psiquiatria Rio de Janeiro: Alhambra, 1986
 Cartas a Spinoza Rio de Janeiro: Francisco Alves, 1995
 Expérience d'art Spontané chez des Schizophrènes dans un Service de Therapeutique Occupationelle (co-operation with Dr. Pierre Le Gallais, II International Psychiatry Congresso in Zurig), Congress Report vol. IV, 380–386, 1957.
Felipe Sales Magaldi: "Psyche meets matter: body and personhood in the medical-scientific project of Nise da Silveira" [Hist. cienc. saude-Manguinhos vol.25 no.1 Rio de Janeiro Jan./Mar], 2018
 Fernando Portela Câmara: "Vida e obra de Nise da Silveira" [Journal of Psychiatry On-Line Brazil], 2002
 Gatos, A Emoção de Lidar. Rio de Janeiro: Léo Christiano Editorial, 1998
 Gullar Ferreira. "Nise da Silveira: uma psiquiatra rebelde," 1996
 Id.: "A contribuição de Nise da Silveira para a Psicologia Junguiana" – [Journal of Psychiatry On-Line Brazil], 2004
 Imagens do inconsciente Rio de Janeiro: Alhambra, 1981
 João A. Frayze-Pereira: "Nise da Silveira: Imagens do Inconsciente entre Psicologia, Arte e Política" in Estudos Avançados. vol.17 n° 49 São Paulo Set./Dic. 2003
 Jung: Vida e Obra,  Rio de Janeiro: José Álvaro Ed., 1968
 Nise da Silveira Brasil, COGEAE/PUC-SP 1992
 O Mundo das Imagens São Paulo: Ática, 1992
 Philatelic Release (2005), n. 1, Brasil.

External links
 Inconscience Museum Web Site 
 Unesco site about the Images of the Unconscious Museum
 A psiquiatria rebelde de Nise da Silveira 
 Mar do Inconsciente – A Imagem Como Linguagem with interviews of Carlos Drummond de Andrade and Frei Betto 

Brazilian psychiatrists
1905 births
1999 deaths
20th-century Brazilian physicians
Jungian psychologists
Analytical psychology
Brazilian women scientists
Brazilian scientists
20th-century women scientists
Brazilian women physicians
Brazilian medical writers
20th-century women physicians
Women psychiatrists
Brazilian art educators